In engineering, span is the distance between two intermediate supports for a structure, e.g. a beam or a bridge.
A span can be closed by a solid beam or by a rope. The first kind is used for bridges, the second one for power lines, overhead telecommunication lines, some type of antennas or for aerial tramways.

Span is a significant factor in finding the strength and size of a beam as it determines the maximum bending moment and deflection. The maximum bending moment  and deflection in the pictured beam is found using:

where 

 = Uniformly distributed load
 = Length of the beam between two supports (span)
 = Modulus of elasticity
 = Area moment of inertia

The maximum bending moment and deflection occur midway between the two supports. From this it follows that if the span is doubled, the maximum moment (and with it the stress) will quadruple, and deflection will increase by a factor of sixteen.

For long-distance rope spans, used as power line, antenna or for aerial tramways, see list of spans.

References

 
Architectural elements
Structural engineering
Bridge components